Lissotesta notalis is a species of sea snail, a marine gastropod mollusk, unassigned in the superfamily Seguenzioidea.

Description
The height of the shell is  1.7 mm.

Distribution
This marine species occurs off South Georgia at depths between 52 m and 100 m.

References

External links
 To World Register of Marine Species

notalis
Gastropods described in 1908